Top-Notch Magazine is an American pulp magazine of adventure fiction published between 1910 and 1937 by Street & Smith in New York City.

History and profile
Top-Notch Magazine was first published in March 1910. Issued twice-monthly, it published 602 editions until it ceased in October 1937. For most of its history, the cover price was 10 cents. Began as a magazine for teenagers and even as a pulp concentrated mostly
on sports stories, switching to a men's adventure magazine in the 1930s. Notable contributors to Top-Notch Magazine included
Jack London, F. Britten Austin, William Wallace Cook, Bertram Atkey, and Johnston McCulley in the early days; and later Robert E. Howard, 
L. Ron Hubbard, Lester Dent, Carl Jacobi, Burt L. Standish, J. Allan Dunn, and Harry Stephen Keeler.

Notes

References
J. Randolph Cox (2000). The Dime Novel Companion: A Source Book (Westport, Conn.: Greenwood Publishing).
Illustrated checklist: Galactic Central website

Defunct magazines published in the United States
Pulp magazines
Magazines established in 1910
Magazines disestablished in 1937
Bimonthly magazines published in the United States
Street & Smith
Magazines published in New York City